Dinastía (born July 20, 1994) is the ring name of a Mexican Luchador enmascarado who works in the Mini-Estrella division for Lucha Libre AAA Worldwide where he is the current AAA World Mini-Estrella Champion in his second reign. His real name is not a matter of public record, as is often the case with masked wrestlers in Mexico, where their private lives are kept a secret from the wrestling fans. Dinastía is a nephew of Super Crazy, Taz El Feroz and Crazy Boy and the older brother of Eclipse Jr.

Championships and accomplishments
Lucha Libre AAA Worldwide
AAA World Mini-Estrella Championship (2 times, current)
AAA Quien Pinta Para La Corona (2011)
Lucha Fighter (Minis 2020)
Wrestling Observer Newsletter
Rookie of the Year (2012)

Luchas de Apuestas record

Footnotes

References

External links
AAA profile

1994 births
Living people
Masked wrestlers
Mexican male professional wrestlers
Mini-Estrella wrestlers
Professional wrestlers from Hidalgo (state)
People from Tulancingo
Unidentified wrestlers
21st-century professional wrestlers